Nadia G's Bitchin' Kitchen is a Canadian cooking television series that began airing simultaneously on Food Network Canada in Canada and Cooking Channel in the United States on April 2, 2010; after originating as a web series in 2007. It was presented by chef and musician Nadia G.

Ali Rosen of The Daily Meal described the series as "a continuation of [Nadia G's] web series", which Nadia G confirmed: "I could create cool aprons, I could dish out recipes, I could do the comedy, music videos, so we've always had a lot of freedom in Bitchin' Kitchen and that has continued."

Bitchin' Kitchen concluded on January 5, 2013, after three seasons. The correspondents on the series would all later appear on Nadia G's subsequent series, Bite This with Nadia G.

Cast
 Nadia G  Herself
 Peter Koussioulas  Panos
 Jordan Lu  Taste Tester
 Ben ShaouliYeheskel Mizrahi, the Spice Agent
 Bart RochonHans

Episodes

References

External links
 
 

2010s Canadian cooking television series
2010 Canadian television series debuts
2013 Canadian television series endings
Cooking Channel original programming
English-language television shows
Food Network (Canadian TV channel) original programming
Food reality television series